The Kreutz sungrazers are a group of comets descended from the breakup of a comet in about 326 AD. They are typically traveling less than 2 solar radii from the Sun. Because they travel so close, they often burn up. Many bright comets are members of the group, including Comet Ikeya–Seki, which broke in 3 pieces in its 1965 perihelion. The Kreutz sungrazers can be subdivided into several groups- a primary group at inclination ~144° and node ~5, and a secondary, smaller group at inclination ~139° node ~350°. The entire group spans several degrees across in their orbits, and make up a significant portion of the known comets in the Solar System—as of November 2015 about 3000 of the 4000 known comets belong to the Kreutz sungrazers group.

See also
List of comets by type
List of hyperbolic comets
List of periodic comets
List of numbered comets

Kreutz Sungrazers